Captain The Hon. Hugh Tyrwhitt (14 July 1856 – 26 October 1907) was a Royal Navy officer who became Naval Secretary. He was the father of noted aesthete and composer Lord Berners.

Naval career
Tyrwhitt was born in 1856, the second surviving son of Sir Henry Thomas Tyrwhitt, 3rd Baronet and Harriet Wilson, 12th Baroness Berners. His elder brother Raymond Tyrwhitt (1855–1918) succeeded as 13th Baron Berners, and his sister Hon. Arden Mary Tyrwhitt (1860–1922) was the wife of Francis Knollys, 1st Viscount Knollys, Private Secretary to King Edward VII.

He was commissioned a sub-lieutenant in the Royal Navy in June 1876, and promoted to lieutenant in February 1881. He served as flag lieutenant to the Commander-in-Chief of the Mediterranean Fleet, served with the Naval Brigade in Sudan and took part in the Nile Expedition to relieve General Charles Gordon in 1884. Promotion to commander followed in June 1893, and to captain in January 1889. On 19 March 1900 he was appointed in command of the battleship HMS Renown, flag ship to Admiral Sir John Fisher, Commander-in-Chief of the Mediterranean Fleet. Fisher resigned from this position in June 1902 to become Second Sea Lord, and Tyrwhitt was succeeded as captain on the Renown by Arthur Murray Farquhar. Following Fisher's recommendation, Tyrwhitt was on 9 October that year appointed Private Naval Secretary to the First Lord of the Admiralty. In 1905 he was again given command of the battleship HMS Renown and escorted the Duke and Duchess of York to India. He died two years later.

References

Sources
 

1856 births
1907 deaths
Royal Navy officers
Younger sons of barons